Gejlarat may refer to:
Gejlarat-e Gharbi Rural District
Gejlarat-e Sharqi Rural District